Ceryx helodiaphana is a moth of the  subfamily Arctiinae. It was described by Roepke in  1937. It is found on Java.

References

Ceryx (moth)
Moths described in 1937